Hypopyra rufescens is a moth of the family Erebidae. It is found in Kenya, Malawi and Zambia.

References

Moths described in 1896
Hypopyra
Moths of Africa
Taxa named by William Forsell Kirby